Andrei Karimov (30 July 1943 – 18 June 2017) is a former professional Soviet football defender and coach. He is better known for his playing and coaching career for the Soviet army team SKA Lvov.

Career
Being born in Chelyabinsk, Karimov started his youth football career in Leningrad. In 1955 he joined Kirovets Leningrad which represented the Kirov Factory in Saint Petersburg (at that time Leningrad). Later until 1964 he played for various other Leningrad teams among which were FShM and Zenit. Eventually Karimov moved to Ukraine where he played for SKA Lvov. It was with this army team that he became the champion of Ukraine in 1965. The same year Karimov was honoured as master of sports in football. Among other clubs in his further playing career were FC Bukovyna Chernivtsi, FC Sokil Lviv, Chojnowianka Chojnów (Poland).

In 1980 Karimov retired as player and became a coach for the Karpaty sports school (SDYuShOR) in Lviv. Later he joined the coaching staff of Volodymyr Bulhakov at SKA Karpaty Lvov. During his coaching career, Karimov also worked in FC Skala Stryi, FC Halychyna Drohobych, and FC Lviv. In particular Andriy Karimov recollects his work in FC Karpaty Lviv during 1999 – 2001 when he assisted to Stepan Yurchyshyn and Lev Brovarsky. During that period Karpaty played in final of the Ukrainian Cup and played against Swedish Helsingborgs IF in the UEFA Cup.

Eventually Karimov returned to coach for the Karpaty sports school where he worked as a theoretic.

The Ukrainian football defender and native of Lviv Ihor Karimov is a son of Andriy Karimov.

References

External links
 

1943 births
2017 deaths
Sportspeople from Chelyabinsk
Soviet footballers
Ukrainian footballers
SKA Lviv players
FC Zenit Saint Petersburg players
FC Bukovyna Chernivtsi players
FC Sokil Lviv players
Soviet expatriate footballers
Expatriate footballers in Poland
Soviet football managers
Ukrainian football managers
FC Skala Stryi (1911) managers
FC Halychyna Drohobych managers
SKA Lviv managers
Association football defenders